Gaspar de Torres (1510 – 5 Jan 1584) was a Roman Catholic prelate who served as Auxiliary Bishop of Seville (1570–1584).

Biography
Gaspar de Torres was born in Torres, Spain in 1510 and ordained a priest in the Order of the Blessed Virgin Mary of Mercy. On 9 Jun 1570, he was appointed during the papacy of Pope Pius V as Auxiliary Bishop of Seville and Titular Bishop of Medaurus. He served as Auxiliary Bishop of Seville until his death on 5 Jan 1584.

References

External links and additional sources
 (for Chronology of Bishops) 
 (for Chronology of Bishops) 
 (for Chronology of Bishops) 
 (for Chronology of Bishops) 

1584 deaths
16th-century Roman Catholic bishops in Spain
Bishops appointed by Pope Pius V
Mercedarian bishops
1510 births
People from the Province of Jaén (Spain)